Channing Rex Robertson is Emeritus Professor of Chemical Engineering at Stanford University. He received his Ph.D. from Stanford under the supervision of Andreas Acrivos. He joined the faculty of Stanford in 1970, and served as the Ruth G. and William K. Bowes Professor and Senior Associate Dean for Faculty & Academic Affairs in the School of Engineering there. In 2000, he was featured in a special issue of Upside, entitled "100 People Who Have Changed the World". He is a founding fellow of the American Institute for Medical and Biological Engineering. He retired from Stanford in 2012 to join the Theranos board of directors, becoming an emeritus professor. Since his active role in the Theranos scandal, he is no longer teaching classes in the School of Engineering.

Theranos
Robertson taught Theranos founder Elizabeth Holmes when she was a student at Stanford, and he went on to become the company's first board member. He convinced Ian Gibbons to work for Theranos in 2005. In 2017, Theranos named him the co-leader of their technology advisory board. Even as Theranos was coming under growing scrutiny, as of May 2018, Robertson still believed the company was successful in developing novel blood testing technology. According to lawyer Reed Kathrein, who sued Theranos on behalf of some of its former investors, the company only paid Robertson to lend itself credibility.

References

External links
Faculty page

American chemical engineers
Living people
Stanford University School of Engineering faculty
Stanford University alumni
University of California, Berkeley alumni
Fellows of the American Institute for Medical and Biological Engineering
Theranos people
Year of birth missing (living people)